Clyde Elmer Anderson (March 16, 1912 – January 22, 1998) was an American politician who served as the 28th governor of Minnesota from September 27, 1951 to January 5, 1955. Anderson also served as the lieutenant governor of Minnesota from 1939 to 1943 and again from 1945 to 1951.

Life and career
Anderson was born in Brainerd, Minnesota, in 1912 to Fred and Anna Anderson, Swedish-speaking Finnish immigrants from Lappfors in Esse, Ostrobothnia, Finland. His father died when he was 14, forcing him to get a job with a magazine and newspaper company to help support the family. He attended Brainerd High School and spent two quarters at the University of Minnesota studying medicine before running out of tuition money and returning home to continue working.

In 1938, he ran for lieutenant governor of Minnesota with Republican gubernatorial candidate Harold Stassen and won. At 31 and 26 years old, respectively, Stassen and Anderson were the youngest governor and lieutenant governor in state history. Anderson was reelected lieutenant governor five more times under three different governors. He holds the record for the most total years served as the state's lieutenant governor.

In September 1951, Anderson became governor when Luther Youngdahl resigned to become a federal judge in Washington, D.C. He won election to a full term in 1952 but was defeated by Orville Freeman two years later. After leaving the governor's office, he served as mayor of Nisswa from 1961 to 1963 and as mayor of Brainerd from 1976 to 1986. He died in Brainerd in 1998. The C. Elmer Anderson Memorial Highway is named in his honor.

References

External links
 The C. Elmer Anderson Papers are available for research use at the Minnesota Historical Society.

1912 births
1998 deaths
People from Brainerd, Minnesota
Republican Party governors of Minnesota
American Lutherans
University of Minnesota Medical School alumni
Lieutenant Governors of Minnesota
Mayors of places in Minnesota
20th-century American politicians
People from Nisswa, Minnesota
20th-century Lutherans